Farhadgerd (also Romanized as Farhādgerd; also known as Farāgerd, Farāh Gird, and Farājerd) is a city in the Central District, in Fariman County, Razavi Khorasan Province, Iran. At the 2006 census, its population was 6,620, in 1,607 families.

References 

Populated places in Fariman County
Cities in Razavi Khorasan Province